Waiting for You may refer to:

Film
Waiting for You (film), a British mystery drama film

Music

Albums
Waiting for You (Gordon Lightfoot album), 1993
Waiting for You (F4 album), 2007
Waiting for You (Lindsay Dracass album), 2019

Songs
"Waiting for You" (Seal song), 2003
"Waiting for You" (Sharon O'Neill song), 1981
"Waiting for You", 1968 hit song for BZN #24
"Waiting for You", a song on the B-side of Andy Gibb's single "Desire"
"Waiting for You", a song on Corey Hart's album Boy in the Box
"Waiting for You", a song on Golden Earring's album Just Earrings
"Waiting for You", a musical piece in The Bodyguard: Original Soundtrack Album, composed by Kenny G
"Waitin for You", a song on Demi Lovato's album Confident

See also

I've Been Waiting for You (disambiguation)
"Tired of Waiting for You", a song by The Kinks
"Right Here Waiting", a song by Richard Marx
"Say Say Say (Waiting 4 U)", song by Hi_Tack
Waiting 4U Tour, Cody Simpson concert tour
"Waiting for a Girl Like You", Foreigner single